Coleophora anthocalia is a moth of the family Coleophoridae. It is found in Tajikistan.

The larvae feed on Atraphaxis pyrifolia. They feed on the flower buds of their host plant.

References

anthocalia
Moths of Asia